Krysta Harden is an American government official who served as United States Deputy Secretary of Agriculture from 2013 to 2016.

Early life and education 
Harden was born and raised in Camilla, Georgia. She earned a bachelor's degree from the University of Georgia.

Career 
Harden began her career at the United States Department of Agriculture in 2009, serving as Assistant Secretary for Congressional Relations until 2011. Harden served as Chief of Staff for Secretary of Agriculture Tom Vilsack from 2011 to 2013.

Harden was appointed United States Deputy Secretary of Agriculture by President Barack Obama in 2013. She resigned as Deputy Secretary in February 2016 and later assumed the position of Vice President of Public Policy and Chief Sustainability Officer at DuPont, a chemical conglomerate.

Personal life
She is married to former Georgia congressman Charles F. Hatcher.

References

External links
 

Year of birth missing (living people)
Living people
People from Camilla, Georgia
University of Georgia alumni
Obama administration personnel
DuPont people
United States Deputy Secretaries of Agriculture